The following is a list of notable alumni of The Hill School. The Hill School is a preparatory boarding school located in Pottstown, Pennsylvania.

A 
 Malcolm Atterbury, 1926 – actor
 William Arrowsmith, 1941 – professor

B 
 John Backus, 1942 – computer scientist; inventor of the FORTRAN computer language
 James Baker III, 1948 – Secretary of State, U.S. Secretary of the Treasury
 Chris Bala, 1997 – professional ice hockey player
 Perry Richardson Bass – investor and philanthropist
 Manoj Bhargava, 1972 – inventor of 5-hour Energy
 Pinckney Benedict, 1982 – screenwriter and author
 George Packer Berry – Dean of Harvard Medical School
 Josiah Bunting III, 1957 – educator, Superintendent of the Virginia Military Institute
 Butch van Breda Kolff, Professional basketball player and coach in the NBA
 Irving T. Bush, businessman
 William Whiting Borden, missionary, heir of Borden fortune
 Cleve Benedict, 1953 – West Virginian Congressman 
 Curtis Bok, 1915 – Pennsylvania Supreme Court Justice
 Hans Brase, 2012 – German Basketball player
George Bradley

C 
 Robert Davis Carey, 1896 –  governor and senator from Wyoming
 John Dickson Carr, 1925 – author
 Sabin Carr, 1924 – Olympic athlete
 Bernard Chan, 1983 – Hong Kong politician and businessman
 William F. Clinger, 1947 – former Congressman from Pennsylvania, 1979–97, US Navy (1951–55, Lt.)
 Henry S. Coleman, c. 1944 – educator
 Chris Collingwood, 1985 – singer, songwriter, member of rock band Fountains of Wayne
 Paul Collins, 1986 – historian and memoirist
 James Cromwell, 1958 – Academy Award-nominated television and film actor
 Briggs Cunningham, 1926 – sportsman, motor enthusiast; won America's Cup yacht race in 1958
 Jay Clayton
 Seward Collins – Distributist, Anti-modernist
 Evans Clark (1888–1970), writer committed first to Communist and Socialist causes and then liberal socio-economic issues.

D 
 Hugh DeHaven, 1914 – professor at Cornell University and "Father of Crash Survivability"
 Kingman Douglass, 1914 –  investment banker; deputy director of CIA
 Jack G. Downing, 1958 – Director of the National Clandestine Service under President Bill Clinton

E 
 Lincoln Ellsworth, 1919 – polar explorer, first to sight geographic North Pole along with explorer Roald Amundsen
 German Horton Hunt Emory
 Nick Eppehimer – professional basketball player
 Brett Eppehimer – professional basketball player

F 
 John Heaphy Fellowes, 1951 – U.S. Navy captain, pilot, and P.O.W. during the Vietnam War
 Leonard Firestone, 1927 – U.S. Ambassador to Belgium, 1974–77, US Navy (WWII, Lt.)
 Clarence Fincke – Captain of Yale Football team, Hill Football coach
 Harold Furth, 1947 – scientist
 Morton Fetterolf – Pennsylvania State Senator
 William Fincke – pacifist minister
 Walter Forbes, 1961 – notable fraudulent executive
 Wilson P. Foss Jr., 1910 – board chair New York Trap Rock Corporation, art dealer and collector of Asian art

G 
 George Garrett, 1941 – poet, novelist, educator
 Chris Gebhard, 1992 – business owner, Pennsylvania state senator
 Wolcott Gibbs, class of '20 but did not graduate – writer for The New Yorker
 S. C. Gwynne, 1970 – bestselling author, Pulitzer Prize finalist
 Caleb Frank Gates, 1922 – Chancellor of the University of Denver

H 
 Harry Hamlin, 1970 – actor
 Dick Harter, 1948 – assistant coach of the Philadelphia 76ers
 Laning Harvey, 1903 – Pennsylvania state senator
 Frederick Herreshoff, 1904 – amateur golfer
 Ralph Hills, 1921 – Olympic shot putter, physician
 Mahlon Hoagland, 1940 – discoverer of transfer RNA
 Randy Hopper, 1985 – Wisconsin State Senator
 Roger Horchow, 1945 – Tony Award-winning Broadway producer
 Clark Hoyt, 1960 – Pulitzer Prize-winning journalist
 James Calhoun Humes, 1952 – speechwriter
 Lamar Hunt, 1951 – businessman
 Nelson Bunker Hunt, did not graduate – scion of the Hunt Oil Company family; donated the costs to renovate his namesake building on campus
 Thad Hutcheson, 1933 – politician
 Sam Horner, 1956 – NFL halfback, defensive back and punter
 Ralph Hills – USA Olympian shot putter, bronze medallist

J 
Alexander Jerrems

K 
 Bob Kudelski, 1983 – professional ice hockey player, 1994 NHL All Star
Theo Killion – CEO 2010–14 tenure led the failing Zale Corporation back from near-bankruptcy
 Eric King – NFL player

L 
 Lewis Lehrman, 1956 – politician, businessman, author
 Robert A. Lovett, 1914 – fourth United States Secretary of Defense
 Bill Luders – notable naval architect
 Steven Lisberger – American film director and producer, directed Tron
 Josiah K. Lilly Jr.

M 
 James A. Michener, 1931 – author; faculty, department of English
 Alberto Mestre, 1982 – Olympian swimmer 
 Charles William Mayo
 Spencer Moseley – CEO of Railway Express Agency
 Devereux Milburn – Big Four polo player

O

P 
 Frank Pace, 1929 – Secretary of the Army; CEO of General Dynamics
 Alan J. Pakula, 1944 – Hollywood director and producer
 George Patton IV, 1942 – Major General in the United States Army; son of World War II General George Patton
 Norman Pearlstine, 1960 – a former top editor at The Wall Street Journal, Time Inc., Bloomberg L.P. and The Los Angeles Times
 Lionel Pincus, 1948 – co-founder of Warburg Pincus
 William Porter, 1944 – Olympic athlete
 Winston L. Prouty, 1924 – U.S. Senator from Vermont (1959–1971)
 William Proxmire, 1934 – U.S. Senator from Wisconsin (D)
 The Pullman Twins (George, Jr. and Walter (Sanger) Pullman) – attended for a term
Edward E. Paramore Jr. – screenwriter
David Paton – founder of Orbis International
 Stephen Puth – Singer; Brother of Charlie Puth

Q 
 William Thomas Quick, 1964 – novelist, screenwriter, blogger.  Named the Blogosphere.

R 
 Pat Rissmiller, 1998 – NHL athlete
 Robert F. Rockwell, 1903 – United States Congressman from Colorado
 Frank Runyeon, 1971 – actor, two-time Emmy Award winner
 William S. Reyburn, Congressman for Pennsylvania
 Peter Rummell, CEO of St. Joe Company
 Parviz C. Raji – Iranian Diplomat

S 
 Len Sassaman, 1998 – computer scientist and biohacker; candidate for Satoshi
Peter Schaffer, 1980 – lawyer and sports agent; clients include Barry Sanders, Hakeem Nicks, Joe Thomas, Russell Okung, Phil Taylor, Trevor Pryce. Star of the Esquire Network docuseries titled "The Agent."
 Jon Shirley, 1956 – former President of Microsoft
 Ernest Simpson, 1915 – British shipping tycoon best known as the second husband of Wallis Simpson, who later married the former King Edward VIII of the United Kingdom, elder brother of King George VI
 Kenneth F. Simpson – congressman
 Lane Smith, attended in 1955, did not graduate – character actor
 Jerry Stahl, 1971 – novelist, screenwriter
 David Stein, 1979 – radio personality
 Oliver Stone, 1964 – Academy Award-winning producer/director
 William Irvin Swoope, 1888 – United States Congressman from Pennsylvania
 Daniel Willard Streeter – hunter, adventurer and author
 Barry Sheen, 1937 – British judge
 Stephen Sohn, 2005 – Korean-American Model

T 
 Harold E. Talbott, 1907 – aviator and President of the Dayton-Wright Airplane Company, which manufactured more wartime aircraft overall than any other U.S. plant; third Secretary of the Air Force; selected the permanent site for the Air Force Academy
 Baird Tipson, Dr., 1961 – President of Washington College
 Franchot Tone, Class of 1923, but did not graduate – prominent, Oscar-nominated actor of American stage, film and television productions
 Juan T. Trippe, 1917 – airline pioneer, founder of Pan Am
 Bobby Troup – composer of "Route 66", musician, composer, jazz authority, recording artist, actor, Emmy Award winner
 Donald Trump Jr., 1996 – son of Donald Trump
 Eric Trump, 2002 – son of Donald Trump; Hill board of trustees
 Roswell Tripp

U 
 David Vogel Uihlein, Sr. – heir to the Joseph Schlitz Brewing Company

V 
John Van Voorhis, 1919 – New York Supreme Court Judge

W 
 John M. Walker, 1927 – physician and investment banker
 Douglas "Sandy" A. Warner III, 1964 – former CEO of J. P. Morgan & Co.
 Laurence Hawley Watres, 1900  – U.S. Congressman from Pennsylvania
 Harry Elkins Widener, 1902 – businessman; son of wealthy businessman George Dunton Widener; grandson of wealthy railroad tycoon Peter A.B. Widener; two buildings donated in his name
 Edmund Wilson, 1912 – writer
 Tom Wolf, 1967 – 47th Governor of Pennsylvania (2015–2023)
 Tobias Wolff, Class of 1964, but was expelled for forging information for admission – writer, novelist, English and writing professor at Stanford
 Sidney Wood – Wimbledon tennis champion
 Irving Price Wanger – congressman
 Benjamin Drake Wright
 Robert Napier Whittemore – industrialist in Connecticut

Y 
 Richard Yuengling Sr., 1933 – President of Yuengling Brewery

References 

The Hill School
 
Lists of American people by school affiliation
Lists of people by educational affiliation in Pennsylvania